1984 was a leap year starting on Sunday of the Gregorian calendar, the 1984th year of the Common Era (CE) and Anno Domini (AD) designations, the 984th year of the 2nd millennium, the 84th year of the 20th century, and the 5th year of the 1980s decade. 

1984 may also refer to:

Orwell's novel and related
Listed in chronological order
 Nineteen Eighty-Four, a 1949 novel by George Orwell
 1984 (Westinghouse Studio One), a 1953 television adaptation for CBS
 Nineteen Eighty-Four (British TV programme), a 1954 BBC television adaptation
 1984 (1956 film), a 1956 film adaptation
 Nineteen Eighty-Four (1984 film), a 1984 film adaptation
 1984 (opera), a 2005 opera adaptation composed by Lorin Maazel
 1984 (play), a 2013 play adaptation by Robert Icke and Duncan MacMillan

Lists
 Adaptations of Nineteen Eighty-Four
 Nineteen Eighty-Four in popular media

Music

Albums
 1984 (Yusef Lateef album), 1965
 1984, an album by Hugh Hopper, 1973
 1984 (Anthony Phillips album), 1981
 1984 (Rick Wakeman album), 1981
 1984 (For the Love of Big Brother), a soundtrack album by Eurythmics for the film Nineteen Eighty-Four, 1984
 1984 (Van Halen album), released as MCMLXXXIV
 1984 (Praxis album), 1997
 1984 (Roger Miret and the Disasters album), 2005
 "1984", an album by Alix Perez, 2009
 1984 (EP), by Ryan Adams, 2014
 1984 (Joan of Arc album), 2018

Songs
 "1984", a song by Spirit, 1969 
 "1984" (song), a song by David Bowie, 1974
 "Sexcrime (Nineteen Eighty-Four)" (song), a 1984 song by the Eurythmics
 "1984", a song by Van Halen from the album 1984
 "1984", a song by Nash the Slash, 1984
 "1984", a song by Hong Kong duo Swing

Other uses
 1984 (magazine), a Warren comic book series
 "1984" (advertisement), a commercial for the Apple Macintosh

See also
 American Horror Story: 1984, the ninth season of American Horror Story
 1Q84, a 2009 novel written by Haruki Murakami
 Will the Soviet Union Survive Until 1984?, a 1969 samizdat essay by Andrei Amalrik